Umred is a town and a municipal council in the Nagpur district of Maharashtra, India. According to the 2011 census the city has a population of 53971.

Geography

Umred is located at 20° 51' 14N and 17° 19' 29E, at an elevation of 290 meters above sea level. It's STD code is 07116.

Demographics
As of the 2011 India census, Umred had a population of 53,971. Males account for 27,456 residents and females for 26515 36,947 of the city's residents are considered literate.

Culture

Umred is the land of the people known as Halba, who are weavers.

It is also land of Mahar ,teli, kunbhi people. In umred every cast of people live friendly.

Climate

The average number of heat wave days occurring in Umred in the summer months, including March, April, and May, are about 0.5, 2.4, and 7.2 days respectively. May is statistically the hottest month, with 18 days of heat waves in 1973, 1988, and 2010. The summer season is characterized by other severe weather activities like thunderstorms, dust storms, hailstorms, and squalls. Generally, hailstorms occur during March and dust storms during both  March and April, but they occur infrequently (0.1 per day). Squalls occur more frequently in March and April with 0.3  occurring per day, rising to 0.8 per day in May.

Administration
There are several people for Administration and Development for this taluka This city administrator by Government of central, state and Corporation.

Karhandla Wildlife Sanctuary
Umred Karhandla Wildlife Sanctuary, about 58 km from Nagpur, comprises about 180 km2. The sanctuary falls under two divisions, Nagpur Division (Kuhi and Bhiwapur Range) and Bhandara Division (Pauni Range), which are divided along the Maru river that flows close to Bhiwapur and joins the Vainganga River. 150 km2 of forest towards the east of Pauni Nilaj road, provides connectivity to the Tadoba Andhari Tiger Reserve.

The number of species that have been identified in this sanctuary is based on direct sightings, as well as help from tracks and signs, and substantiated by interviewing local people. Tiger, sloth bear, leopard, wild dog, ratel, Indian fox, wolf, jackal, and jungle cat are the main carnivore species found here. Gaur, blue bull, sambar deer, barking deer, wild boars, and spotted deers are the main herbivore species found in the sanctuary. Over the last few years, Umred Karhandla has seen an increase in number of tourists, as it is close to the city and also due to the increase in the number of tiger sightings.

Economy

Western Coalfields Limited has three large open-cast mines close to the town. It is the largest employer in the taluka. The fourth mine is also scheduled to open within a month. The coal production will be enhanced from 2.2 million to 10 million tons-per-year in next five years.

Coal mining
W.C.L Umred is an open cast mine which is the major coal productive mine in this area. The 8 million ton-per-annum Nagpur-Umred coal mines are owned by Western Coalfields Limited, a subsidiary of state-owned Coal India. The mining area is separated into the Umred Makardhokra, Kamptee, and Bokhara coalfields.

Transportation and Communication
 Umred is also connected to Nagpur via State Highway No. 9.

Education facilities
Umred has more than 20 schools and colleges, including engineering colleges and educational institutes. Modern High School (MHS) Umred WCL Umred project which is one of the best schools.  There are also other private schools like New Ideal Girls' High School, Sanskar Vidyasagar, Silver Oak International School, Public high School, Ashok Vidyalaya,Jeevan Vikas Vidyalaya and Nutan Adarsh Mahavidyalaya for primary, secondary and higher education. Some other higher education institutions are Umred College of Engineering, Bhausaheb Mulak College of Pharmacy, Mahatma Fule College of Commerce and Om Polytechnic.

Villages in Umred

References

 

Cities and towns in Nagpur district
Talukas in Maharashtra